This is a list of people elected Fellow of the Royal Society in 1920.

Fellows 
Edward Frankland Armstrong
Sir Jagadis Chunder Bose
Robert Broom
Edward Provan Cathcart
Alfred Chaston Chapman
Arthur Prince Chattock
Sir Arthur William Hill
Cargill Gilston Knott
Frederick Alexander Lindemann, Viscount Cherwell
Francis Hugh Adam Marshall
Sir Thomas Ralph Merton
Robert Cyril Layton Perkins
Henry Crozier Keating Plummer
Sir Robert Robinson
John William Watson Stephens

Statute 12 

Herbert Albert Laurens Fisher
Sir James George Frazer

1920
1920 in the United Kingdom
1920 in science